In chemistry, the double bond rule states that elements with a principal quantum number greater than 2 for their valence electrons (period 3 elements and higher) tend not to form multiple bonds (e.g. double bonds and triple bonds). The double bonds, when they exist, are often weak due to poor orbital overlap. Although such compounds are not intrinsically unstable, they instead tend to polymerize. Numerous violations to the rule exist.

Other meanings
Another unrelated double bond rule exists that relates to the enhanced reactivity of sigma bonds attached to an atom adjacent to a double bond. In bromoalkenes, the C–Br bond is very stable, but in an allyl bromide, this bond is very reactive. Likewise, bromobenzenes are generally inert, whereas benzylic bromides are reactive. The first to observe the phenomenon was Conrad Laar in 1885. The name for the rule was coined by Otto Schmidt (1874–1943) in 1932.

References

Chemical bonding